The 2022–23 Serie B (known as the Serie BKT for sponsorship reasons) is the 91st season of the Serie B since its establishment in 1929.

Changes
The following teams have changed division since the 2021–22 season:

To Serie B
Relegated from Serie A
 Cagliari
 Genoa
 Venezia

Promoted from Serie C
 Südtirol (Group A)
 Modena (Group B)
 Bari (Group C)
 Palermo (Play-off winners)

From Serie B
Promoted to Serie A
 Lecce
 Cremonese
 Monza

Relegated to Serie C
 Vicenza
 Alessandria
 Crotone
 Pordenone

Südtirol plays in Serie B for the first time in history for this season.

Teams

Stadiums and locations

Number of teams by regions

Personnel and kits

Managerial changes

League table

Positions by round
The table lists the positions of teams after each week of matches. In order to preserve chronological evolvements, any postponed matches are not included to the round at which they were originally scheduled, but added to the full round that were played immediately afterwards.

Results

Season statistics

Top goalscorers

Top assists

Hat-tricks

Note
(H) – Home  (A) – Away

Clean sheets

References

External links

 

Serie B seasons
Italy
2
Current association football seasons